Viana do Castelo is a municipality and seat of the district of Viana do Castelo in the Norte Region of Portugal. The population in 2011 was 88,725, in an area of 319.02 km². The urbanized area of the municipality, comprising the city, has a population of approximately 36,148 inhabitants, although the extended densely populated region reaches surrounding municipalities like Caminha and Ponte de Lima with a population above 150,000 inhabitants. It is located on the Portuguese Way path, an alternative path of the Camino de Santiago, and at the mouth of the Lima river.

History
Human settlement in the region of Viana began during the Mesolithic era, from discoveries and archaeological excavations. Even around the Roman occupation the area was settled along the Mount of Santa Luzia.

The settlement of Viana da Foz do Lima, which it was called when King Afonso III of Portugal issued a foral (charter) on 18 July 1258, was a formalization of the 1253 Viana that the area was named.

In the 16th century, its port gained great importance as one of the entry-points for Portuguese explorers and traders, involved in the Portuguese discoveries. Many of the historical buildings originated during this period.

The prosperity that continued developed from the town's role as a port, protected by defensive structures (such as the Tower of Roqueta) to repel pirates from Galicia and north Africa. The port's ties to northern Europe came primarily from exports of wine, fruits and salt, and imports of tile, textiles and glass.

After the maritime discoveries and trade, the commercial life of Viana reached its greatest proportions during the reign of Queen Maria II of Portugal, when the monarch established the Associação Comercial de Viana do Castelo in 1852 (the fourth oldest public company of its type). The queen, in order to reward the loyalty of its citizens, who did not surrender to the Count of Antas, elevated the town to the status of city on 20 January 1848, renaming the settlement with its current name.

Geography

Administratively, the municipality is divided into 27 civil parishes (freguesias):

 Afife
 Alvarães
 Amonde
 Anha
 Areosa 
 Barroselas e Carvoeiro
 Cardielos e Serreleis
 Carreço
 Castelo do Neiva
 Chafé
 Darque
 Freixieiro de  Soutelo
 Geraz do Lima (Santa Maria, Santa Leocádia e Moreira) e Deão
 Lanheses
 Mazarefes e Vila Fria
 Montaria
 Mujães
 Nogueira, Meixedo e Vilar de Murteda
 Outeiro
 Perre
 Santa Marta de Portuzelo
 São Romão de Neiva
 Subportela, Deocriste e Portela Susã
 Torre e Vila Mou
 Viana do Castelo (Santa Maria Maior e Monserrate) e Meadela
 Vila de Punhe
 Vila Franca

Climate
Viana do Castelo has a warm-summer Mediterranean climate (Köppen: Csb; Thornthwaite: ArB’2a’) with substantial oceanic influences characterized by warm, relatively dry summers and mild, rainy winters. It is also one of the rainiest cities in Continental Portugal.

Economy
Home to a modern service based economy, the city, along with its region, has a seaport with naval repairing facilities. Its major industries are related to naval construction and repair, with the Estaleiros da Viana do Castelo remaining one of the few large shipyards still in operation. Home to a large cluster of wind green electricity and car-parts industries it has become one of the most dynamic exporting regions in the country.

Architecture

Civic
Since the early 1990s the city started a wide urban renewal plan, pioneering the "Polis program", and including enlarging the pedestrian areas, building new modern architecture and creating new public spaces and parks. Architects such as Siza Vieira, Eduardo Souto de Moura and Fernando Távora have participated in the construction of a modern, well preserved and lively city center.

Geraz do Lima carriage museum
Renaissance fountain (1535) in the Major Square
Palacio de Tavoras, a noble residence from the 16th and 17th centuries
Municipal Museum, housed in an 18th-century building and home to
Paços do Conselho ("Palace of the Council", 1502), of which only the façade remains today

Religious
Church of Sâo Domingos (1576)
 Chapel of the Holy Family
 Chapel of Our Lady of the Agony, church in Roccoco style
 Cathedral of Viana do Castelo, the 15th-century parochial church and cathedral, was constructed in the Romanesque style, comprising a façade flanked by two large towers with merlons, while the middle Gothic portal with archivolts is decorated by sculptures depicting the Passion of Christ and of the Apostles. The interior designed in the form of the Latin cross, includes a nave and two aisles (separated by arches supported by pillars), as well as two ancillary chapels dedicated to São Bernardo and the Holy Sacrament, both attributed to João Lopes "the Elder".
 Church of Mercy of Viana do Castelo, designed in the Flemish-style. The building dates back to 1589.
 Sanctuary of Saint Lucy, designed by Miguel Ventura Terra and dedicated to the cult of the Sacred Heart of Jesus and Saint Lucy of Syracuse.

Culture

In 2010, Viana do Castelo started to implement a project of rehabilitation of the city called Viana Criativa which is based on an investigation made by Paulo Caldeira along 4 years. Such project has the main purpose to attract more residents to a city where, during the last 500 years, many people around the world arrived to trade. Once upon a time, Viana was the second center of commerce of Portugal and some investigators are now recognising that fado music was born based on the typical songs of Minho region.

Sport
SC Vianense is the local football club. Founded in 1898, it is one of the oldest clubs in Portugal. They play their home matches at the 3000 capacity Estádio do Dr. José de Matos.

Notable people 

 João Álvares Fagundes (ca.1460–1522) ship owner, explored Newfoundland & Nova Scotia.
 Caramuru (ca.1475-1557) helped the early colonization of Brazil by the Portuguese crown.
 João de Sousa, 3rd Marquis of Minas (1666-1722) nobleman and the 6th Count of Prado.
 Luís do Rego Barreto (Viscount Geraz Lima) (1777–1840) a military officer and colonial administrator
 Sebastião Lopes de Calheiros e Meneses (1816–1899) a colonial administrator of Cape Verde and Angola.
 Adriana de Vecchi (1896-1995) a cellist, Montessori-trained educator and founder of a Lisbon music school for children
 Óscar de Lemos (1906–1954) a Portuguese stage and film actor.
 Sofia Aparício (born 1970) a Portuguese model and actress.
 Tânia Carvalho (born 1976) a choreographer and works in music, drawing and film.

Sport 

 Rui Rêgo (born 1980) a former football goalkeeper with 538 club caps.
 Nuno Santos (born 1980) a former footballer with 389 club caps
 Tiago Mendes (born 1981) a football manager and former player with 457 club caps and 66 for  Portugal 
 Nélson Lenho (born 1984) a former footballer with 358 club caps
 Iúri Leitão (born 1998) a Portuguese road and track cyclist
 Francisco Trincão (born 1999) footballer for Wolverhampton Wanderers F.C. with over 120 club caps and 7 for  Portugal
 Pedro Neto (born 2000) footballer for Wolverhampton Wanderers F.C. with over 70 club caps and 3 for  Portugal

International relations

Viana do Castelo is twinned with:

 Alagoas, Brazil
 Aveiro, Portugal
 Cabedelo, Brazil
 Hendaye, France
 Igarassu, Brazil
 Itajaí, Brazil
 Lancaster, England
 Lugo, Spain
 Matola, Mozambique
 Pessac, France
 Porto Seguro, Brazil
 Ribeira Grande, Cape Verde
 Rio de Janeiro, Brazil
 Riom, France
 Viana, Brazil

Gallery

References

External links

 Viana do Castelo - A Healthy City - Youtube video
 Photos from Viana do Castelo
 O blog de Viana do Castelo

 
Cities in Portugal
Municipalities of Viana do Castelo District
Port cities and towns in Portugal